Angus McCuaig (born 7 January 1958) is a Scottish former athlete of the 1980s.

McCuaig, one of four brothers, was born and raised in the town of Garelochhead. In 1981, McCuaig became the first man in 47-years from the West of Scotland to win the New Year Sprint. He had to hand back his cheque in order to retain his amateur status and compete for Scotland at the Commonwealth Games in Brisbane, where he was a member of the bronze medal-winning  team. In the UK Athletics Championships, he placed as high as third in the sprint events. He was a five-time Scottish AAA 200 metre champion, breaking the record held by Eric Liddell.

References

External links
Gus McCuaig at World Athletics

1958 births
Living people
British male sprinters
Scottish male sprinters
Sportspeople from Argyll and Bute
Commonwealth Games bronze medallists for Scotland
Commonwealth Games medallists in athletics
Athletes (track and field) at the 1982 Commonwealth Games
Medallists at the 1982 Commonwealth Games